Double ended or double-ended may refer to: 

 Double-ended ferry, see Ferry#Double-ended
 Double-ended queue
 Double-ended priority queue
 Double-ended tram
 Double-ended playing cards
 Double-ended pipefish
 Double ended stern